Alexey Valeryevich Kulemzin (born 13 June 1974) is a politician from the Donbas region, who serves as Mayor of Donetsk since 2016. 

A member of the pro-Russian Donetsk Republic movement, he previously served as a Member of the People's Council of the Donetsk People's Republic from 2015 to 2016.

Biography 
Kulemzin was born on 13 June 1974 in Donetsk, Ukrainian SSR, USSR.

In 1997 he graduated from the Donetsk National University with a degree in economics and production management, qualifying as an economist. Three years later, in 2000, he graduated from Donetsk National Technical University with a degree in public service.

From May 1998 to 2014, he was an employee of the Donetsk Regional State Administration. During this period, he held different positions. Between 2007 and 2010, he was Head of the Department for Foreign Economic Relations and European Integration. Later, between 2011 and 2013, he was the Deputy Head of the Department for Regional Development, Attraction of Investment and Foreign Economic Relations. He received an additional degree as Candidate of Sciences in 2011.

He participated in the 2014 pro-Russian unrest in Ukraine that lead to the de facto replacement of the regional administration by the Donetsk People's Republic (DPR). In November 2014, he was appointed Director of the Donetsk utility company "Donelektroavtotrans". In September 2015, he became a Member of the People's Council of the DPR.

On 17 October 2016, DPR Head Alexander Zakharchenko appointed Kulemzin acting Mayor of Donetsk. In May 2019, he took office on a permanent basis.

References 

1974 births
Living people
Pro-Russian people of the war in Donbas
Ukrainian collaborators with Russia
Mayors of Donetsk
Donetsk National University alumni
Donetsk National Technical University alumni